Dina Pandzic is a Bosnian-born Canadian fashion model. Her television work includes a leading role in the Bosnian drama: "Dubina".

Early life 
Pandzic, who is of Bosniak ethnicity, was born in the industrial town of Lukavac in northwestern Bosnia and Herzegovina on August 18, 1991. A turbulent time in the country's history, Pandzic's family moved to Toronto, Ontario, Canada to avoid war and poverty, when she was four years old.

Dina got her first taste of modelling when she posed for a friend who happened to be an aspiring photographer. It was when she turned 17 years old, that Pandzic decided to pursue modelling by attending local modelling events, as a side job to fund her future goal: to open a beauty salon. Dina, a licensed esthetician, now operates her own salon out of Toronto.

Personality 
Pandzic's hobbies include exercise, cooking, reading and video games. She dedicates herself to voluntary work in her native Bosnia and Herzegovina, to aid disadvantaged orphans. Having visited Bosnia and Herzegovina many times since settling in Canada, it remains her favorite destination to visit.

References

External links 
 

1991 births
Living people
Bosnia and Herzegovina emigrants to Canada
Bosnia and Herzegovina female models
Canadian people of Bosnia and Herzegovina descent
People from Toronto
People from Tuzla Canton
Yugoslav Wars refugees